Simone Griffeth (born April 4, 1950), sometimes credited under her married name Simone Griffeth-McDonald, is an American actress. She was a Theater Arts major at the University of South Carolina for three years. While attending college Simone acted in a weekly children's show for a Columbia television station. She appeared in a TV commercial at age 15.

Life and career
The tall, blonde Griffeth was born in Savannah, Georgia. She made her film debut as the titular sweet innocent country girl in the redneck country exploitation film Swamp Girl (1971). She then went on to star in a number of movies in the 1970s, followed by numerous recurring roles in many prime-time TV series through the early 1980s, including her role of serious minded reporter Gretchen on Ladies' Man (1980–81) and as Beatrice Arthur's spoiled daughter-in-law Arlene on Amanda's (1983). Griffeth reunited with her former Ladies Man co-star Herb Edelman in an episode of The Golden Girls, playing Stan Zbornak's second wife, Chrissy. In 2017, Simone began a comeback by portraying a hard-nosed, matriarch of a renowned, Savannah, Georgia law firm in the crime-drama, "Untouched". She continues to coach actors in the Hilton Head area.

Among the TV shows Griffeth has done guest spots on are Hawaii Five-O, The Six Million Dollar Man, Starsky and Hutch, The Incredible Hulk, The Dukes of Hazzard, Three's Company, The Greatest American Hero, Hart to Hart, Buffalo Bill, T.J. Hooker, Magnum, P.I., Riptide, The Golden Girls, Bret Maverick and Silk Stalkings.

Currently, while between acting jobs, she works as a real estate agent for high-end Low Country properties, together with husband Wayne McDonald.

Selected filmography

References

External links
 
 
 

American television actresses
American film actresses
Actresses from Georgia (U.S. state)
1950 births
Living people
20th-century American actresses
21st-century American actresses
Actors from Savannah, Georgia